Events in the year 1865 in Portugal.

Incumbents
Monarch: Louis I
Prime Minister: Joaquim António de Aguiar

Events
 8 July - Legislative election.

Arts and entertainment
The 1865 International Exhibition was held in Porto

Sports

Births

14 September – Guilherme Ivens Ferraz, Navy officer (d. 1956)

Alfredo Rodrigues Gaspar, military officer and politician (died 1938)
John Buttencourt Avila, Portuguese American farmer, father of the sweet potato industry (died 1937)

Deaths

References

 
1860s in Portugal
Portugal
Years of the 19th century in Portugal
Portugal